Animethon is a three-day anime convention held annually at Edmonton Convention Centre in Edmonton, Alberta. It is Canada's longest-running anime convention, the first being held in 1994.

History
Animethon was formed back in 1994 by the Banzai Anime Klub of Alberta (BAKA) and hosted by (BAKA II), with the intention of promoting Japanese anime. It became a success by presenting well-known and more obscure anime to audiences and has since grown to what it is now. Today, Animethon is presented by the non-profit organization, Alberta Society for Asian Popular Arts (ASAPA).

In the beginning, Animethon 1 was a one-day event that allowed people to view different Japanese anime movies and television shows within two classrooms at Grant MacEwan. From there, it expanded to the whole 106th street building during Animethon 2 through 10. It was not until Animethon 11 that the festival grew to utilize the entire university campus for events, artist alley, education panels, and a large vendor hall. As such, the steady increase of numbers in attendees to Animethon has allowed for various vendors to expose themselves to a unique group of people both young and old.

In 2019, since moving to the Edmonton Convention Centre,  Animethon has hit the 10k attendance mark and also to be one of the longest running anime convention in Canada.

Animethon has experienced several years of consecutive growth in attendance while increasing their scope to include musical guests from Japan such as FLOW, ROOKIEZ is PUNK'D, Yoko Ishida, Kanon Wakeshima, An Cafe, and Ladybeard.

The event was not held in 2020 and 2021 due to the COVID-19 pandemic, but is set to return in August 2022.

Events and programming
Animethon has expanded their focus beyond screening anime and now also include voice actor guests from North America, musical acts from North America and Japan, improvisation groups, as well as various related activities such as gaming, costume contests, anime music video compilations/contests, and more.

Event history

A Taste of Animethon
A Taste of Animethon was first created in 2010. Initially, it was a smaller event meant to supplement ASAPA's lineup of events, but grew quickly and was eventually moved to the Shaw Conference Centre in 2016. It was suspended after the 2018 event due to the difficulties of simultaneously planning Animethon and an increasingly-large Taste of Animethon.

The event was intended to be revived in 2022 to make up for the cancellation of the 2020 and 2021 events due to the COVID-19 pandemic. However, the event was ultimately cancelled due to Omicron variant.

ASAPA control

In 2004 the event was transferred to a new society, the Alberta Society for Asian Popular Arts (ASAPA), a non-profit society that focuses on the promotion and enjoyment of Asian popular art and culture. The society is also the financial and legal backbone of Animethon, formed under the Societies Act of Alberta.

References

External links
 Animethon website

Anime conventions in Canada
Festivals in Edmonton
Recurring events established in 1994
MacEwan University
1994 establishments in Alberta
Annual events in Canada
Festivals established in 1994